Tracks is a 1922 American silent Western film directed by Joseph J. Franz and written by L. V. Jefferson and Mark Noble.  The film stars Bill Patton, George Berrell, and François Dumas.

Cast list

References

1922 Western (genre) films
American black-and-white films
Films directed by Joseph Franz
Silent American Western (genre) films
1920s American films